Roxana Vulescu (born 31 October 1954) is a Romanian athlete. She competed in the women's high jump at the 1972 Summer Olympics.

References

1954 births
Living people
Athletes (track and field) at the 1972 Summer Olympics
Romanian female high jumpers
Olympic athletes of Romania
Place of birth missing (living people)